Królik is a Polish surname. Notable people with the surname include:

, Polish musician of band Łąki Łan
Golda Krolik  (born 1892), Detroit activist and organizer
Sonja Oberem, née Krolik (born 1973), German athlete, who specialized in the marathon races

Polish-language surnames